This is a list of acts of the Parliament of South Africa enacted in the years 1980 to 1989.

South African acts are uniquely identified by the year of passage and an act number within that year. Some acts have gone by more than one short title in the course of their existence; in such cases each title is listed with the years in which it applied.

1980

1981

1982

1983

1984

1985

1986

1987

1988

1989

References
 Government Gazette of the Republic of South Africa, Volumes 177–288.
 

1980